Person County Airport , also known as Raleigh Regional Airport at Person County, is a county-owned, public-use airport in Person County, North Carolina, United States. It is located six nautical miles (11 km) south of the central business district of Roxboro.

According to the FAA's National Plan of Integrated Airport Systems for 2009–2013, it is a general aviation airport (it had previously been a reliever airport).

Although many U.S. airports use the same three-letter location identifier for the FAA and IATA, this airport is assigned TDF by the FAA but has no designation from the IATA.

Facilities and aircraft 
It has one runway designated 6/24 with an asphalt surface measuring 6,005 by 100 feet (1,830 x 30 m).

For the 12-month period ending May 24, 2019, the airport had 34,750 aircraft operations, an average of 95 per day: 95% general aviation, 3% military and 2% air taxi. At that time there were 30 aircraft based at this airport: 82% single-engine and 18% multi-engine.

References

External links 
 Raleigh Regional Airport at Person County, official site
  at North Carolina DOT airport guide
 Aerial photo as of April 1998 from USGS The National Map via MSR Maps
 

Airports in North Carolina
Transportation in Person County, North Carolina
Buildings and structures in Person County, North Carolina